A list of Free University of Berlin people. Alumni and faculty of the Free University include many scientists, philosophers and politicians, amongst them five Nobel Prize winners and 19 Leibniz laureates.

Prize winners

Nobel laureates

Herta Müller, novelist and Nobel Prize in Literature (2009) (Professor)
Gerhard Ertl, physicist and Nobel Prize in Chemistry (2007) (Professor)
Reinhard Selten, economist and Nobel Memorial Prize in Economic Sciences (1994) (Professor)
Ernst Ruska, physicist and Winner of Nobel Prize in Physics (1986) (Professor)
Ulrich Cubasch, climate scientist and co-author of reports by the Intergovernmental Panel on Climate Change, which was awarded the Nobel Peace Prize in 2007(Professor)

Leibniz Prize winners

The DFG has awarded the Gottfried Wilhelm Leibniz Prize to outstanding German scientists every year since 1985. As the most acclaimed award for research achievements in Germany, it comes with a research grant of 2.5 million € to be used within seven years.

  Volker Erdmann, Biochemistry (1987)
  Wolfram Saenger, Crystallography (1987)
  Randolf Menzel, Neuroscience (1991), member of the German Academy of Sciences Leopoldina
  Irmela Hijiya-Kirschnereit, Japanese Studies (1992)
  Jürgen Kocka, History (1992)
  Johann Mulzer, Organic chemistry (1994)
  Peter Schaefer, Jewish Studies (1994)
  Emo Welzl, Computer science (1995)
  Onno Oncken, Geology (1998)
  Regine Hengge-Aronis, Microbiology (1998)
  Joachim Küpper, Romance studies (2001), member of the Leopoldina
  Günter M. Ziegler, Mathematics (2001), member of the Leopoldina, current president of the Free University of Berlin
Hélène Esnault, Mathematics (2003)
  Rupert Klein, Mathematics (2003)
Gerhard Huisken (2003)
Gabriele Brandstetter, Theater studies (2004), member of the Leopoldina
Gyburg Radke, Ancient Greek (2006), youngest ever person to receive the Leibniz prize
Beatrice Gründler Arabic Studies (2016)
Benjamin List, Organocatalysis (2016)

Professors

Johannes Agnoli, political scientist
Arnulf Baring, historian and political scientist
Peter Bieri, philosopher and writer
Dieter Claessens, sociologist and anthropologist
Cecilia Clementi, computational biophysicist
Gordon A. Craig, historian and writer
Konstantinos A. Dimadis, Greek scholar
Peter Eigen, Founder of Transparency International
Günter Faltin, economist
Paul Feyerabend, philosopher
Ernst Fraenkel, political scientist
Wolfgang Fritz Haug, philosopher, founder of the journal Das Argument
Reinhard Furrer, scientist and astronaut
Roman Herzog, President of Germany (1994–1999)
Monika Hilker, biologist
Klaus Jacob, political scientist
Hans Kauffmann, art historian
Walther Killy, German literary scholar, Der Killy
Herbert Marcuse, sociologist
Yann Martel, writer
Friedrich Meinecke, historian and founder of FUB
Ernst Nolte, historian
Renate Radek, protistologist
Wolfgang Rautenberg, mathematician
Stefan Rinke, historian
Thomas Risse, political scientist
Raúl Rojas, computer scientist
Edith Schönert-Geiß, numismatist
Gesine Schwan, political scientist and candidate for the 2004 German presidential election
Péter Szondi, literary scholar
Georges Tamer, Islamic studies scholar
Jacob Taubes, sociologist of religion, philosopher, and scholar of Judaism
Lorenz Weinrich, historian

Alumni

Politicians

Andrea Fischer, Federal Ministry of Health (1998–2001)
Annette Groth, politician in the German Left Party
Eberhard Diepgen, Mayor of (West) Berlin (1984–1989, 1991–2001)
Fritz Teufel, political activist in the 1960s, founder of Kommune 1
Günter Rexrodt, Economics Minister of Germany (1993–1998)
Hans Eichel, Federal Ministry of Finance (1999–2005)
Hans-Christian Ströbele, vice-leader of the German Green Party in the Bundestag
Hans-Jürgen Papier, Federal Constitutional Court of Germany (2002–2010)
Helga Zepp-LaRouche, German political activist, wife of American political activist Lyndon LaRouche
Herta Däubler-Gmelin, Justice Minister of Germany (1998–2002)
Ingeborg Gräßle, Member of the European Parliament
Jan-Marco Luczak, politician and lawyer
Jutta Limbach, President of the Federal Constitutional Court of Germany (1994–2002), President of Goethe-Instituts (2002–2008)
Klaus Hänsch, President of the European Parliament (1994–1997)
Klaus Uwe Benneter, German politician
Mario Laserna Pinzón, Colombian politician
Marion Caspers-Merk, politician
Otto Schily, Federal Ministry of the Interior (1998–2005)
Leon Schreiber, South African academic, author and politician
Vassilios Skouris, President of the Court of Justice of the European Communities (since 2003)
Walter Momper, Mayor of West Berlin (1989–1991)
Florika Fink-Hooijer, prominent European civil servant
Nora Schimming-Chase, Namibia's first ambassador to Germany

Others
  

Erdmute Alber, German sociologist, ethnologist, she receive her PhD, supervisor Georg Elwert 
F. W. Bernstein, poet, cartoonist, satirist and academic
Thomas Bierschenk, German ethnologist and sociologist
Volkmar Braunbehrens, German musicologist
Reinhold Brinkmann, musicologist
Christopher Clark, historian
Lars Clausen, German sociologist
 Georg von Dadelsen, German musicologist, Neue Bach-Ausgabe
Jonathan Franzen, novelist
Jeannette zu Fürstenberg, businesswoman and aristocrat
Edwin Gentzler, American Germanist and translation scholar
Ina Hartwig, journalist, author, Kulturdezernentin of Frankfurt
Roman Inderst, economist
Parag Khanna, Indian American author and analyst in the field of international relations
Walther Killy, German literary scholar, Der Killy
Paul Alfred Kleinert, German writer, editor and translator
Mario Kopić, Croatian philosopher and author
Elmar Kraushaar, journalist and author
Shoucheng Zhang, theoretical physicist
Amity Shlaes, Senior fellow in economic history at the Council on Foreign Relations and syndicated columnist
Wolfgang Schomburg, first German judge at the International Criminal Tribunal for the former Yugoslavia and at the International Criminal Tribunal for Rwanda
Wolfgang Becker, German film director and writer
Markus Büchler, surgeon and physician
Götz Aly, journalist, sociologist and historian
Peter Loewenberg, historian, psychologist and professor at UCLA
Stefan Heidemann, orientalist
Jacques de Caso, American historian
Frank W. Stahnisch, historian
Gregor Thum, historian
Michael Stürmer, historian
Carsten Niemitz, anatomist and ethologist
José María Pérez Gay, information scientist
Julian Voss-Andreae, sculptor and physicist
Bertram Gawronski, social psychologist
Michael Roes, writer and filmmaker
Hartmut Zinser, scholar in the field of religious studies and ethnology
Gudrun Ensslin, terrorist
David Madden (Jeopardy! contestant), Jeopardy! contestant and art historian
Horst Mahler, political activist
Baby Varghese, Indian church historian and scholar
Jón Bjarki Magnússon, Icelandic journalist and filmmaker

Honorary degrees
During its history, Free University has awarded various people with an honorary degree, amongst them:

1949: Ernst Reuter – mayor of West Berlin from 1948 to 1953
1949: Theodor Heuss – first President of the Federal Republic of Germany from 1949 to 1959 (by the Department of Philosophy)
1956: Lise Meitner – physicist, co-discoverer of nuclear fission (by the Department of Physics)
1963: Walter Gropius – architect and founder of the Bauhaus School (by the Department of Philosophy)
1964: Robert F. Kennedy – American politician from the Kennedy family who served as Attorney General (by the Department of Philosophy)

1998: Paul Krugman – American Nobel Prize-winning economist (by the JFK Institute for North American Studies)
1999: Bronislaw Geremek – Polish social historian and politician (by the Otto Suhr Institute)
1999: Salman Rushdie – British Indian novelist and essayist (by the Department of Philosophy and Humanities)
2001: Kofi Annan – Ghanaian diplomat who served as the seventh Secretary-General of the United Nations (by the Department of Political and Social Sciences)
2005: Günter Grass – Nobel Prize-winning writer (by the Department of Philosophy and Humanities)
2005: Imre Kertész – Hungarian Nobel Prize-winning writer (by the Department of Philosophy and Humanities)
2006: Marcel Reich-Ranicki – Polish-born German literary critic and member of the literary group Gruppe 47 (by the Department of Philosophy and Humanities)
2006: Theodor W. Hänsch – Nobel Prize-winning physicist (by the Department of Physics)
2007: Orhan Pamuk – Turkish Nobel Prize-winning writer (by the Department of Philosophy and Humanities)
2008: Cees Nooteboom – Dutch novelist, poet, and journalist (by the Department of Philosophy and Humanities)
2010: Ed Diener – American psychologist (by the Department of Education and Psychology)
2010: Jagdish Bhagwati – Indian-born American economist (by the School of Business and Economics)
2012: Homi K. Bhabha – Indian-English scholar and critical theorist (by the Department of Philosophy and Humanities)
2010: George M. Whitesides – American chemist (by the Department of Biology, Chemistry, Pharmacy)

References 

Berlin
Free University of Berlin